Antix may refer to:

 Antix (video game), a 1985 game for MS-DOS developed by the creator of Tetris
 Antix Productions, a UK television production company who produce Most Haunted 
 antiX, a Linux distribution based on Debian
 Antix (rapper), British-Jordanian hip hop artist
 Antix (band), a band from Los Angeles, California

See also
 Antics (disambiguation)